Arrasando Con Fuego is the debut studio album by the Duranguense band K-Paz de la Sierra. It was released in 2003 on Prcan.

Track listing
 Con Olor A Hierba
 Jambalaya
 Imposible Olvidarte
 Anillo Grabado
 El Domingo Se Casa
 La Lupe
 Los Ojos De Pancha
 Las Tres Tumbas
 Ayer Bajé De La Sierra
 Rafita Polka

Chart performance

Singles

References

Notes
K-Paz de la Sierra Official MySpace

K-Paz de la Sierra albums
2003 albums